Pen Argyl Area School District is a public school district located in Northampton County, Pennsylvania in the Lehigh Valley region of eastern Pennsylvania. It serves the boroughs of Pen Argyl and Wind Gap and Plainfield Township.

As of the 2021–22 school year, the school district had a total enrollment of 1,450 students between all three of its schools, according to National Center for Education Statistics data.

Students in grades nine through 12 attend Pen Argyl Area High School in Pen Argyl.

Schools
Pen Argyl Area High School
Wind Gap Middle School
Plainfield Elementary School

References

External links
Official website
Pen Argyl Area School District on Facebook

School districts established in 1899
School districts in Northampton County, Pennsylvania
1899 establishments in Pennsylvania